Kurt Kuschela (born 30 September 1988 in Berlin) is a German sprint canoeist. He won the gold medal in the 2012 Summer Olympics in C-2 1000 metres category event for his country with his teammate Peter Kretschmer.

References

External links
 Profile
 

1988 births
German male canoeists
Living people
Canoeists at the 2012 Summer Olympics
Olympic canoeists of Germany
Olympic gold medalists for Germany
Olympic medalists in canoeing
ICF Canoe Sprint World Championships medalists in Canadian
Medalists at the 2012 Summer Olympics
Canoeists from Berlin